The phrase "world famous in New Zealand" is a commonly used phrase within New Zealand and the slogan of Lemon & Paeroa soft drink. It is used to describe items that though famous within New Zealand are unknown in the rest of the world, whereas similar items and people in larger countries would have a far higher media profile and would therefore be famous worldwide.

The term is simultaneously both parochially proud and self-deprecatingly humorous. It indicates a pride that a small country should be able to produce individuals which, in the opinion of the speaker, would be of a necessary standard to become world famous, yet at the same time it recognises that these individuals come from a country which does not have a high international recognition factor, and therefore these individuals are destined to remain "big fish in a small pond".

History 

The phrase was created by Saatchi & Saatchi Auckland, the advertising agency of Coca-Cola Amatil at the time, and came into widespread use in 1993 when it was used as the slogan for the New Zealand soft drink Lemon & Paeroa (L&P).

The phrase is similar to one coined by Canadian writer Mordecai Richler in the 9 April 1971 issue of Life referring to professional hockey players being "world famous – in Canada". Ironically, it is a phrase that became popular in Canada despite being printed in an American magazine. It came to describe Canadian musicians, writers, and other cultural touchstones that were intensely popular inside of Canada but relatively unknown beyond its borders. The phrase was often associated with Richler himself.

In 2009 Paeroa businessman Tony Coombe tried to prevent Coca-Cola Amatil from trademarking the phrase, saying it was a "Kiwi-ism" that belonged to all New Zealanders. However, an Intellectual Property Office commissioner disagreed, and when he later appealed to the High Court, the appeal was dismissed, allowing Coca-Cola Amatil to trademark the phrase.

Other uses 

The phrase has also been used as the title of a 1999 album, World Famous In New Zealand, a compilation album by New Zealand rock musicians released by Epic Records, and a 2001 book, World Famous in New Zealand: How New Zealand's Leading Firms Became World-Class Competitors, by Colin Campbell-Hunt, James Brocklesby, Sylvie Chetty, Lawrie Corbett, Sally Davenport, Deborah Jones, and Pat Walsh (Auckland, Auckland University Press).

The phrase inspired the title of the 18th episode of the popular show Power Rangers Dino Charge, "World Famous (in New Zealand)", and also takes place in New Zealand. Albert Smith, a tour guide and adventurer the rangers meet, also refers to himself with the phrase.

See also
New Zealand culture
"Big in Japan"

References

External links
 The original L&P television commercial (1994)
Harvey, H. "Kiwi speak", Taranaki Daily News online, 3 August 2013. Retrieved 5 August 2015. The first paragraph gives an example of the phrase as it is used in New Zealand.

New Zealand culture
New Zealand advertising slogans
1993 neologisms
Celebrity